The 2018 UEFA European Under-17 Championship (also known as 2018 UEFA Under-17 Euro) was the 17th edition of the UEFA European Under-17 Championship (36th edition if the Under-16 era is also included), the annual international youth football championship organised by UEFA for the men's under-17 national teams of Europe. England, which were selected by UEFA on 26 January 2015, hosted the tournament.

A total of 16 teams played in the tournament, with players born on or after 1 January 2001 eligible to participate. Each match had a duration of 80 minutes, consisting of two halves of 40 minutes with a 15-minute half-time.

The Netherlands won their third title by beating Italy 4–1 on penalties in the final after a 2–2 draw. Spain were the defending champions, but were eliminated by Belgium in the quarter-finals.

Qualification

All 55 UEFA nations entered the competition (including Kosovo who entered for the first time), and with the hosts England qualifying automatically, the other 54 teams competed in the qualifying competition to determine the remaining 15 spots in the final tournament. The qualifying competition consisted of two rounds: Qualifying round, which took place in autumn 2017, and Elite round, which took place in spring 2018.

Qualified teams
The following teams qualified for the final tournament.

Note: All appearance statistics include only U-17 era (since 2002).

Notes

Final draw
The final draw was held on 5 April 2018, 17:30 BST (UTC+1), at the St George's Park in Burton, England. The 16 teams were drawn into four groups of four teams. Hosts England were assigned to position A1 in the draw, while the other teams were seeded according to their results in the qualification elite round, with the seven best elite round group winners (counting all elite round results) placed in Pot 1 and drawn to positions 1 and 2 in the groups, and the remaining eight teams (the eighth-best elite round group winner and the seven elite round group runners-up) placed in Pot 2 and drawn to positions 3 and 4 in the groups.

Venues
The tournament took place at six venues across the Midlands and South Yorkshire. England's opening match took place at the Proact Stadium in Chesterfield with the final taking place at the New York Stadium in Rotherham.

Match officials
A total of 8 referees, 12 assistant referees and 4 fourth officials were appointed for the final tournament.

Referees
 Tihomir Pejin
 Zbynek Proske
 Juri Frischer
 Robert Harvey
 Vilhjálmur Alvar Thórarinsson
 Dennis Higler
 Horațiu Feșnic
 Halil Umut Meler

Assistant referees
 Robert Steinacher
 Rza Mammadov
 Georgi Doynov
 Dan Petur Pauli Højgaard
 Levan Todria
 Chasan Koula
 Péter Kóbor
 Yuriy Tikhonyuk
 Vytis Snarskis
 Vladislav Lifciu
 Douglas Potter
 Volodymyr Vysotskyi

Fourth officials
 Robert Hennessy
 Keith Kennedy
 Tim Marshall
 Bryn Markham-Jones

Squads

Each national team submitted a squad of 20 players (Regulations Article 40).

Group stage
The final tournament schedule was confirmed on 10 April 2018.

The group winners and runners-up advance to the quarter-finals.

Tiebreakers
In the group stage, teams are ranked according to points (3 points for a win, 1 point for a draw, 0 points for a loss), and if tied on points, the following tiebreaking criteria are applied, in the order given, to determine the rankings (Regulations Articles 17.01 and 17.02):
Points in head-to-head matches among tied teams;
Goal difference in head-to-head matches among tied teams;
Goals scored in head-to-head matches among tied teams;
If more than two teams are tied, and after applying all head-to-head criteria above, a subset of teams are still tied, all head-to-head criteria above are reapplied exclusively to this subset of teams;
Goal difference in all group matches;
Goals scored in all group matches;
Penalty shoot-out if only two teams have the same number of points, and they met in the last round of the group and are tied after applying all criteria above (not used if more than two teams have the same number of points, or if their rankings are not relevant for qualification for the next stage);
Disciplinary points (red card = 3 points, yellow card = 1 point, expulsion for two yellow cards in one match = 3 points);
UEFA coefficient for the qualifying round draw;
Drawing of lots.

All times are local, BST (UTC+1).

Group A

Group B

Group C

Group D

Knockout stage
In the knockout stage, penalty shoot-out is used to decide the winner if necessary (no extra time is played).

Bracket

Quarter-finals

Semi-finals

Final

Goalscorers
4 goals

 Yorbe Vertessen
 Edoardo Vergani

3 goals

 Brian Brobbey
 Daishawn Redan
 Troy Parrott
 Felix Mambimbi

2 goals

 Jamie Yayi Mpie
 Malik Memišević
 Tommy Doyle
 Leon Dajaku
 Manu Emmanuel Gyabuaa
 Alessio Riccardi
 Thomas Rekdal
 Álex Baena
 Eric García
 Fredrik Hammar

1 goal

 Jérémy Doku
 Gabriel Lemoine
 Sekou Sidibe
 Nemanja Nikolić
 Nikolas Dyhr
 Andreas Kirkeby
 Xavier Amaechi
 Arvin Appiah
 Matty Daly
 Bobby Duncan
 Can Bozdogan
 Dan Lugassy
 Jean Freddi Greco
 Samuele Ricci
 Crysencio Summerville
 Jurriën Timber
 Liam van Gelderen
 Oscar Aga
 Leo Cornic
 Félix Correia
 Gonçalo Ramos
 Eduardo Ribeiro
 Bernardo Silva
 Adam Idah
 Miguel Gutiérrez
 Nils Mortimer
 Nabil Touaizi
 Benjamin Nygren
 Rasmus Wikström
 Tician Tushi

1 own goal

 Stefan Rankić (playing against Belgium)
 Eric García (playing against Germany)
 Arnau Tenas (playing against Netherlands)

Team of the tournament
The UEFA technical observers selected the following 11 players for the team of the tournament (previously a squad of 18 players were selected):

Goalkeeper
 Luca Ashby-Hammond

Defenders 
 Nicolò Armini
 Ismael Armenteros
 Harald Martin Hauso
 Liam van Gelderen

Defensive midfielders
 Wouter Burger
 Iván Morante

Attacking midfielders 
 Xavier Amaechi
 Yorbe Vertessen
 Mohammed Ihattaren

Forward 
 Alessio Riccardi

References

External links

UEFA Under-17 history: 2017/18
2017/18 final tournament: England, UEFA.com

 
2018
Under-17 Championship
2018 Uefa European Under-17 Championship
2017–18 in English football
2018 in youth association football
May 2018 sports events in Europe